The Intersport Cup 2021 is a friendly women's handball tournament held between 25 and 28 November 2021, organised by the Norwegian Handball Federation as preparation for the home team for the 2021 World Women's Handball Championship and named Intersport for sponsorship reasons.

Results

Round robin
All times are local (UTC+2).

References

External links
Norges Håndballforbund Official Website

Intersport Cup
Handball competitions in Norway